Beaucamps-le-Vieux is a commune in the Somme department in Hauts-de-France in northern France.

Geography
The commune is situated at the junction of the D96, D496 and D211 roads,  from the banks of the Bresle, the border of the departments of the Somme and Seine-Maritime.

Population

History

In 1891, Beaucamps-le-Vieux became the provisional terminal of the Somme regional railway, coming from Amiens, then later reaching Aumale in 1901 and eventually Envermeu in 1906.
The line closed to passengers in 1940, and to all traffic in 1947.  The train station still stands, but is in private ownership.

See also
Communes of the Somme department

References

Communes of Somme (department)